Song Min-kyu (born 25 August 1990) is a South Korean tennis player.

Song has a career high ATP singles ranking of 587 achieved on 20 May 2019 and a career high ATP doubles ranking of 113, achieved on 2 March 2020. Song has won three Challenger doubles titles.

Song has represented South Korea at the Davis Cup, where he has a win–loss record of 1–5 as of 12 September 2022.

Challenger and Futures finals

Singles: 5 (3–2)

Doubles: 29 (17–12)

External links
 
 
 

1990 births
Living people
South Korean male tennis players
Tennis players from Seoul
People from Yongin
21st-century South Korean people